The Senate Homeland Security and Governmental Affairs Subcommittee on Financial and Contracting Oversight was one of the four subcommittees within the Senate Committee on Homeland Security and Governmental Affairs, during the 113th congress.

Members, 113th Congress

References

External links

Homeland Security Financial and Contracting Oversight